Red Carpet was a showbiz magazine programme produced by Nova TV. It was a popular programme in Croatia, with reporters and journalists that report world and local showbiz information, as well as stories about famous people, fashion and various modern events.

Red Carpet also aired sarcastic episodes about Croatian celebrities known as Bijele udovice (trans. White widows).

The editor and host was Daniel Delale, and co-hosts were Ana Stunić and Ivana Nanut. In 2010, the show aired on Sundays at 11 pm.

The production ceased in 2012.

References

Croatian television series
2003 Croatian television series debuts
2012 Croatian television series endings
2000s Croatian television series
2010s Croatian television series
Nova TV (Croatia) original programming